Brian Robinson Jr. (born March 22, 1999) is an American football running back for the Washington Commanders of the National Football League (NFL). He played college football at Alabama, where he was two-time CFP national champion before being selected by the Commanders in the third round of the 2022 NFL Draft. Prior to the start of his rookie season, Robinson was shot twice during an armed robbery after leaving a restaurant and returned to the team less than two months later.

Early life and high school
Robinson Jr. was born on March 22, 1999, in Tuscaloosa, Alabama. He attended Hillcrest High School, where he rushed for 990 yards and 18 touchdowns as a senior and was named second team Class 6A All-State. Robinson was rated a four-star recruit and committed to play at the University of Alabama.

College career
In his collegiate debut against Vanderbilt, Robinson scored his first collegiate rushing touchdown in the 59–0 victory. As a freshman, Robinson rushed for 165 yards and two touchdowns as a reserve player behind Najee Harris and Josh Jacobs as Alabama went on to win the 2018 CFP National Championship Game.

In the 2018 season, Robinson carved out a role as Alabama's fourth running back. Robinson gained 272 yards and two touchdowns on 63 carries in his sophomore season.

In the 2019 season, Robinson became Alabama's second running back, only behind Najee Harris. As a junior, Robinson rushed 96 times for 441 yards and five rushing touchdowns while catching 11 passes for 124 receiving yards. 

In the 2020 season, Robinson continued to be the second running back to Harris. Alabama won their second national title during his time there. He totaled 91 carries for 483 rushing yards and six rushing touchdowns.

Following Harris leaving for the NFL Draft, Robinson finally became Alabama's featured back as a fifth-year senior in 2021. Though hampered by injuries, Robinson roughly equaled his output of the previous four years, leading the SEC in carries and touchdowns. He dominated the Alabama backfield in terms of production. On October 2, against Ole Miss, he had 36 carries for 171 rushing yards and four rushing touchdowns in the 42–21 victory. In the following game against Texas A&M, he had 207 scrimmage yards in the 41–38 loss. In the next game against Mississippi State, he had 141 scrimmage yards and three total touchdowns in the 49–9 victory. In the next game, against Tennessee in the Third Saturday in October, he had 26 carries for 107 rushing yards and three rushing touchdowns in the 52–24 victory. He was named the most valuable player of the 2021 Cotton Bowl Classic after rushing for 204 yards, a school record for a bowl game. He finished the 2021 season with 271 carries for 1,343 rushing yards, and 14 rushing touchdowns to go along with 35 receptions for 296 receiving yards and two receiving touchdowns.

Professional career

Robinson was selected by the Washington Commanders in the third round (98th overall) of the 2022 NFL Draft, as one of three picks the New Orleans Saints had traded to acquire the pick they used to draft Chris Olave. He signed his four-year rookie contract on May 18, 2022. On August 28, 2022, Robinson was shot in the knee and glute during an armed robbery involving two men after leaving a restaurant in the Near Northeast neighborhood of Washington, D.C. shortly before 6p.m. EDT. He suffered no life-threatening damage and was discharged from MedStar Washington Hospital Center the following day. Robinson missed the first four games of the season before making his NFL debut in Week 5 against the Tennessee Titans, where he rushed nine times for 22 yards. 

Robinson's first career touchdown came the following week against the Chicago Bears, a game-winner in the fourth quarter of a Commanders victory. He recorded his first career 100-yard rushing game in a Week 12 win over the Atlanta Falcons. As a rookie, he appeared in 12 games and started nine. He finished with 205 carries for 797 rushing yards and two rushing touchdowns to go along with nine receptions for 60 receiving yards and one receiving touchdown. He was named the 2022 Inspiration of the Year by Sports Illustrated and was voted Washington's Ed Block Courage Award by his teammates.

References

External links

 
 Washington Commanders bio
 Alabama Crimson Tide bio

1999 births
Living people
American football running backs
Alabama Crimson Tide football players
Washington Commanders players
Sportspeople from Tuscaloosa, Alabama
Players of American football from Alabama
African-American players of American football
21st-century African-American sportspeople
American shooting survivors
Ed Block Courage Award recipients